Antonio Ramon Delgado (born January 28, 1977) is an American attorney and politician serving as the lieutenant governor of New York since 2022. A member of the Democratic Party, Delgado served as the U.S. representative from New York's 19th congressional district from 2019 to 2022. He is the first person of either African–American or Latino descent to be elected to Congress from Upstate New York, and the first Latino person to hold statewide office in New York.

On May 3, 2022, Governor Kathy Hochul announced that she had appointed Delgado to serve as lieutenant governor, after Brian Benjamin resigned; Delgado was sworn in on May 25, 2022. On November 8, 2022, Delgado won a full term as lieutenant governor, on Hochul's ticket.

Early life and career
Delgado was born on January 28, 1977, in Schenectady, New York, to Tony Delgado and Thelma P. Hill. He is of African American, Cape Verdean, Mexican, Colombian, and Venezuelan ancestry. Delgado has three younger brothers: Kito, Kendall, and Julian. He grew up in the Hamilton Hill neighborhood of Schenectady.

Delgado attended Notre Dame-Bishop Gibbons High School and played for the school's basketball team as a forward. In his senior year, The Daily Gazette named Delgado to its all-area second team. He then enrolled at Colgate University and played for the Colgate Raiders men's basketball team alongside future Golden State Warriors player Adonal Foyle. Delgado graduated from Colgate in 1999 and earned a Rhodes Scholarship to study at The Queen's College, Oxford, from which he received a Master of Arts in 2001. In 2005, Delgado graduated from Harvard Law School.

After law school, Delgado moved to Los Angeles in 2005 and worked in the music industry. In 2007, Delgado released a socially conscious rap album under the stage name "AD the Voice". He then worked as a litigator in the New York office of the law firm Akin Gump.

U.S. House of Representatives

Elections

2018

He defeated six other candidates in the Democratic Party's primary election and faced incumbent Republican John Faso in the November 6 general election.

During Delgado's campaign, he criticized Faso for his votes against the Affordable Care Act. Faso, alongside the Congressional Leadership Fund and the National Republican Congressional Committee, launched attacks on Delgado's former rap career, commonly referring to Delgado as a "big city rapper." The New York Times Editorial Board condemned the attacks as "race-baiting."

Delgado won the general election, receiving 132,001 votes to Faso's 124,408. He was sworn into office on January 3, 2019.

2020

Delgado ran for reelection to a second term in 2020. He ran unopposed in the Democratic primary and faced Republican nominee Kyle Van De Water, an attorney and former trustee of the village of Millbrook, New York. Delgado won the general election with 192,100 votes to Van De Water's 151,475.

Tenure
As of June 2022, Delgado had voted in line with Joe Biden's stated position 100% of the time.

Committee assignments 
 Committee on Agriculture
 Subcommittee on Biotechnology, Horticulture, and Research
 Subcommittee on Commodity Exchanges, Energy, and Credit
 Committee on Small Business
 Subcommittee on Economic Growth, Tax and Capital Access
 Committee on Transportation and Infrastructure
 Subcommittee on Highways and Transit
 Subcommittee on Water Resources and Environment

Lieutenant governor of New York 
On May 3, 2022, after Lieutenant Governor Brian Benjamin resigned, New York Governor Kathy Hochul appointed Delgado lieutenant governor of New York. Delgado was sworn in on May 25. He appeared on the Democratic primary ballot in the 2022 election for lieutenant governor. He won the primary election with 58% of the vote and appeared with Hochul on the general election ballot.

Electoral history

Personal life 
Delgado married Lacey Schwartz in 2011. In 2015, Schwartz made Little White Lie, a documentary film for PBS about being biracial. Delgado and Schwartz have twin sons and live in Rhinebeck, north of Poughkeepsie.

See also
 List of African-American United States representatives
 List of Hispanic and Latino Americans in the United States Congress
 List of minority governors and lieutenant governors in the United States

References

External links

Lt. Governor Antonio Delgado official government website

|-

|-

1977 births
20th-century African-American people
21st-century African-American politicians
21st-century American politicians
21st-century American rappers
African-American lawyers
African-American members of the United States House of Representatives
African-American people in New York (state) politics
African-American rappers
Afro-Mexican
Alumni of The Queen's College, Oxford
American Rhodes Scholars
American men's basketball players
American people of Cape Verdean descent
American politicians of Mexican descent
American politicians of Colombian descent
American people of Venezuelan descent
Colgate Raiders men's basketball players
Democratic Party members of the United States House of Representatives from New York (state)
Harvard Law School alumni
Hispanic and Latino American members of the United States Congress
Hispanic and Latino American people in New York (state) politics
Lieutenant Governors of New York (state)
Living people
New York (state) lawyers
People from Rhinebeck, New York
Politicians from Schenectady, New York